William Crisp Rose (1 December 1861 – 2 February 1937) was an English international footballer who played as a goalkeeper.

Early and personal life
Born in Euston, Middlesex, Rose was the eldest of three sons; their father was a carpenter, a trade which Rose also later practiced. The family later moved to Aston in Birmingham. He married in August 1886; his wife died by the end of the year. He had a second marriage in September 1896, and four children.

Career
Rose began his career with Small Heath, Swindon Town, Swifts, Swindon Victoria, Corinthian, Preston North End, Warwick County, Wolverhampton Wanderers and Loughborough Town. He won the FA Cup once and was runner-up twice.

He earned five caps for England between 1884 and 1891.

Later life and death
By 1891 he was the hotel manager of a pub in Wolverhampton, at which his younger brother was a barman. By 1901 he was a 'beerhouse keeper' in Crewe, and by 1911 he was the manager of a pub in Birmingham. He also worked as a tobacconist in Bordesley.

He slipped outside a shop and died on 2 February 1937, aged 75.

References

1861 births
1937 deaths
English footballers
England international footballers
Birmingham City F.C. players
Swindon Town F.C. players
Swifts F.C. players
Corinthian F.C. players
Preston North End F.C. players
Warwick County F.C. players
Wolverhampton Wanderers F.C. players
Loughborough F.C. players
English Football League players
Association football goalkeepers
FA Cup Final players